Bharadwaj is a surname mostly used by Brahmins. Notable people with the surname include:
Abhay Bharadwaj (1954–2020), Indian advocate turned politician
Anasuya Bharadwaj (born 1982), Indian television presenter and actress
Anita Bharadwaj, Indian high altitude rescue doctor
B. M. Rahul Bharadwaj (born 2000), Indian badminton player
Babu Bharadwaj (1948–2016), Malayalam–language writer and journalist from Kerala, India
Chaitan Bharadwaj (born 1988), Indian music composer
Deepak Bharadwaj (1950–2013), Indian politician
Girish Bharadwaj (born 1950), Indian social worker
H R Bharadwaj (1939–2020), Indian politician
Hitesh Bharadwaj (born 1991), Indian television actor, model, anchor, RJ and poet 
Jagannath Bharadwaj (1916–1987), Indian politician
Janani Bharadwaj (born 1989), Indian playback singer
Krishna Bharadwaj (actor) (born 1989), Indian television actor
Krishna Bharadwaj (economist) (1935–1992), Indian Neo-Ricardian economist 
Nitish Bharadwaj (born 1963), Indian television and film actor, director, screenwriter, film and TV programme producer and veterinarian
Radha Bharadwaj, Indian filmmaker, film producer and screenwriter
Ram Chandra Bharadwaj (died 1918), Indian politician
Ravi Bharadwaj (born 1992), Indian basketball player
Saurabh Bharadwaj (born 1979), Indian politician
Shapath Bharadwaj (born 2002), Indian sport shooter
Somnath Bharadwaj (born 1964), Indian theoretical physicist
Sudha Bharadwaj (born 1961), Indian trade-unionist, activist and lawyer
Suresh Bharadwaj (born 1952), Indian politician
Vedanth Bharadwaj (born 1980), Indian vocalist and composer
Vijay Bharadwaj (born 1975), former Indian cricketer 
Vinay Bharadwaj (born 1983), Indian-Singapore-based ex-banker turned filmmaker, television host, motivational speaker, and fashion stylist
Vishal Bharadwaj (born 1965), Indian film director, screenwriter, producer, music composer and playback singer

Hindustani-language surnames
Surnames of Hindustani origin